That Summer of White Roses is a 1989 Yugoslav-British film directed by Rajko Grlić.

References

External links

That Summer of White Roses at Filmski-Programi.hr 

1989 films
English-language Yugoslav films
Films directed by Rajko Grlić
War films set in Partisan Yugoslavia
1980s English-language films